Robert Newton Halloran (December 14, 1906 – July 25, 1936) was an American swimmer. He competed in two events, representing Canada, at the 1932 Summer Olympics. Halloran committed suicide by jumping from the fourth floor of his house in 1936.

References

1906 births
1936 suicides
Canadian male swimmers
Olympic swimmers of Canada
Swimmers at the 1932 Summer Olympics
Naturalized citizens of the United States
Suicides by jumping in the United States
Suicides in Ohio